Stora Bornö is an island in Gullmarn fjord, belonging to the Lysekil Municipality.

References

Bibliography

External links 

Islands of Västra Götaland County